The Danish royal family traces its descent from the 10th century to the present monarch, Queen Margrethe II of Denmark.

House of Gorm

House of Estridsen
Note: This chart also includes the kings from the Houses of Bjelbo (Olaf II); Pomerania (Eric VII) and Palatinate-Neumarkt (Christopher III) + the son of Hakon Sunnivasson (Eric III)

House of Oldenburg

House of Glücksburg
 

Family trees
 
 
Dynasty genealogy